Richard Dennis Oliver Austin FRCM (26 December 1903, in Birkenhead – 1 April 1989, in Reading) was the chief conductor of the Bournemouth Municipal Orchestra from 1934 until 1940 and later a Professor of the Royal College of Music.

Early life
The son of Frederic and Amy Austin, Austin was educated at Gresham's School, Holt, the Royal College of Music, and in Munich. At Gresham's, he acted in school plays, in 1921 playing Benedick in Much Ado About Nothing and in 1922 Hortensio in The Taming of the Shrew, opposite W. H. Auden as Katherina.

Career
After his second 6-month stint in Munich, Austin became an assistant conductor for the Royal College opera class. He was assistant conductor and chorus master for a production of Mr Pepys at the Everyman Theatre, Hampstead, and for other theatrical shows. Adrian Boult invited him to assist with an opera season in Bristol which Austin assumed the lead when Boult was obliged to go to Egypt, and was then asked to be conductor of the small professional Glen Pavilion orchestra in the city with whom he made his first broadcast on the BBC. 
In 1929, he became Conductor for three years with the Carl Rosa Opera Company touring throughout Great Britain, and then worked briefly with the short-lived Metropolitan Opera Company in 1933. While conducting an all-star production of The Golden Toy at the London Coliseum with Peggy Ashcroft, Wilfred Lawson, Nellie Wallace and Lupino Lane the following year, he saw an advertisement for the musical director of the Bournemouth Municipal Orchestra.

Chosen from a large number of applicants to succeed Sir Dan Godfrey, from 1934 to 1940 Austin was Musical Director of the Bournemouth Corporation, that is, he was the chief conductor of the Bournemouth Municipal Orchestra, which is now the Bournemouth Symphony Orchestra. In 1935 he married the 'cellist Leily Howell whom he had met when she played a concerto with the Bournemouth orchestra. During his years on the south coast Austin was expected to conduct three concerts per week in the winter and more in summer; requiring him to greatly expand his repertoire. For the annual festival Austin continued the tradition of Godfrey in inviting eminent musicians to take part, these included Thomas Beecham, Henry Wood, Hamilton Harty and Igor Stravinsky.

He resigned from the Municipal Orchestra when Bournemouth Corporation cut the complement to only 24 players. During the Second World War he served as Music Advisor, Northern Command (1941–1945), ENSA. Following the war, he became a Professor of the Royal College of Music, from 1946 to 1976, and was also the college's Director of Opera from 1955 to 1976, when he retired.

Concurrently, Austin served as Music Director to the New Era Concert Society (1947–1957) and was a guest conductor at Sadler's Wells Theatre, with other London and provincial orchestras in the UK, and overseas in the Netherlands, Belgium, Germany, Spain, Sweden, Switzerland, Finland, Yugoslavia, Czechoslovakia, Cuba, Mexico, South Africa, the United States, and also in South America.

Recording
Austin recorded a selection of works by Balfour Gardiner in May 1955 for Argo, with Alexander Young, the Goldsmiths’ Choral Union and the London Symphony Orchestra (Overture to a Comedy, Shepherd Fennel’s Dance, April, Philomela). Later that year with cellist André Navarra he set down recordings of Bloch's Schelomo and Tchaikovsky's Variations on a Rococo Theme Op.30 for Parlophone. A recording of The Beggar's Opera featured Dennis Noble, Carmen Prietto, Martha Lipton, Roderick Jones, Marjorie Westbury, John Cameron and William McAlpine.

Notes

1903 births
1989 deaths
Alumni of the Royal College of Music
English conductors (music)
British male conductors (music)
Fellows of the Royal College of Music
People educated at Gresham's School
20th-century British conductors (music)
20th-century English musicians
20th-century British male musicians
20th-century British musicians